Fayik Rifat Abdi (born October 8, 1997 ) is an Olympic alpine ski racer from Saudi Arabia. He is the first Saudi Arabian ski racer to compete in the Winter Olympic Games and the first ever Winter Olympian from Saudi Arabia and the Gulf. After graduating from the University of Utah, Salt Lake City, Abdi returned to Saudi Arabia to pursue skiing as a professional sport.

Early life and education
Abdi was born on October 8, 1997, in San Diego, California. He attended IMG Academy for high school and graduated from the University of Utah in 2020. As a young boy, Abdi's mother would take him to the slopes of Lebanon, where he would practice skiing. He later started traveling to Switzerland to a winter camp, where he trained in skiing.

Career
In 2017, he worked at Snowbird as Ski Technician and then went to Alta Ski Area on the same designation in November 2019. In 2022, Abdi completed his historic participation in the giant slalom competition at the 2022 Beijing Olympics, finishing 44th out of 91 competitors.

As of 2022, Abdi is an athlete for the Saudi Olympic & Paralympic Committee and the Saudi Olympic Training Center.

See also
Saudi Arabia at the 2022 Winter Olympics
Alpine skiing at the 2022 Winter Olympics
Alpine skiing at the 2022 Winter Olympics – Qualification

References

1997 births
Living people
Alpine skiers at the 2022 Winter Olympics
Saudi Arabian male alpine skiers
Olympic alpine skiers of Saudi Arabia
Sportspeople from San Diego